The Supercopa de Chile (Supercup of Chile) is an annual one-match football official competition in Chile organised by the Asociación Nacional de Fútbol Profesional (ANFP).

This competition serves as the season opener and is played between the Campeonato Nacional Champions and the winners of the Copa Chile of the previous season.

Host city

The stadium that hosted the match and the date are defined when the two teams are qualified, for reason of distance between the two clubs. In 2013, the trophy was played in Antofagasta, and in 2014 was played in Santiago.

Finals

Performance

Performance by club

References

External links
 Official Site

Football competitions in Chile
Recurring sporting events established in 2013
2013 establishments in Chile
Chile